Rudolf "Rudi" Völler (born 13 April 1960), nicknamed "Tante Käthe" ("Aunt Käthe"), is a German former professional football player and manager who serves as the sporting director for Bayer Leverkusen.

A forward, Völler won the FIFA World Cup in 1990 as a player. He also scored an equalizing goal to make it 2–2 in the 81st minute of the 1986 FIFA World Cup Final vs Argentina, but it ended up with a 3–2 victory for Argentina. Along with Mário Zagallo, Franz Beckenbauer and Didier Deschamps, Völler has the distinction of reaching a World Cup final as both a player (1986 and 1990) and as a manager (2002).

Club career
Völler started his career with 1860 Hanau, then played for second division sides Kickers Offenbach and TSV 1860 Munich, before joining Bundesliga club Werder Bremen in 1982, winning his first cap for West Germany that same year. Following a successful season in which he was the Bundesliga's top scorer, foreign clubs became interested in the striker, and in 1987 he was transferred to Roma, where he became a mainstay of the team and earned the nickname "er tedesco" ("the German") and also "il tedesco volante" ("the flying German"). He won the Coppa Italia in 1991 and was the club's top scorer on several occasions.

In 1992, Roma decided to sell Völler to Marseille, where he was intended as replacement for superstar striker Jean-Pierre Papin. That also allowed Roma to add Claudio Caniggia as its third foreigner to the squad, so both parties were happy to let the deal go through. There he won his biggest club honour in a very successful first season, thanks to the UEFA Champions League won with Olympique de Marseille against AC Milan coached by Fabio Capello, in 1993 (1–0, goal scored by Basile Boli). Völler started the match, playing 78 minutes. Marseille was then caught in a bribery scandal, however, and was stripped of its 1993 league title, and were relegated despite a second-place finish in 1994. Völler scored 24 league goals for the club but departed after its relegation. Returning to Germany, he joined Bayer Leverkusen in 1994, where he ended his career as a player in 1996 and started a career in the management of the club.

International career
Völler was capped 90 times for the Germany national team, scoring 47 goals, including eight in World Cup final rounds.

Völler also played at three UEFA European Championships, starting with Euro 1984, where he scored twice in a group match against Romania which the Germans won 2–1. A 90th minute defeat against Spain in their next match, however, saw West Germany eliminated when all they needed was a draw.

At the 1986 FIFA World Cup, Völler scored the West Germans' equalizer in a 2–1 win over Scotland in the group stage. He bagged a last minute goal against France in the semi-final to seal a 2–0 win and in the final itself his 80th-minute goal made it 2–2 against Argentina.  Germany had recovered from 2–0 down but eventually lost the match 3–2. Völler became the third player to score as a substitute in the World Cup final, after Dick Nanninga in 1978 and Alessandro Altobelli achieved this feat in 1982.

West Germany hosted the Euro 1988, and Völler scored twice in a 2–0 win over Spain but the hosts lost to eventual winners the Netherlands in the semi-final.

Völler was a member of the team that won the 1990 World Cup in Italy. He scored three times in the tournament, including one goal in a 4–1 win over Yugoslavia, and then found the net twice against the United Arab Emirates in a 5–1 win. During the second-round match against the Netherlands, Völler and Dutch player Frank Rijkaard were sent off the field after the Dutchman spat on Völler twice. In the semi-final against England Völler limped off injured in the first half and was replaced by Karl-Heinz Riedle. However Völler recovered to start the final against Argentina, which Germany won 1–0 to claim their 3rd World Cup title

The unsavoury incident that took place during the second-round match with the Netherlands started when Rijkaard was booked for a bad tackle on Völler. As Rijkaard took up position for the free kick, he spat in Völler's hair. Völler complained to the referee and was booked as well. From the resulting free kick, a furious Völler then jumped up and punched the ball with his hand (although it looked like he had used his head) and then dived to avoid a collision with Dutch goalkeeper Hans van Breukelen, although it also looked as if he had dived for a penalty. Van Breukelen was angry at this, but Rijkaard again confronted Völler by twisting his ear and stamping on his foot. The temperamental and tough Argentine referee Juan Carlos Loustau finally had enough of Völler's and Rijkaard's antics and he sent both players off. Rijkaard then again spat in Völler's hair as they left the pitch and was rumoured to have repeated this on the touchline. Rijkaard later stated that it was his fault: "That day I was wrong. There was no insult. I always had much respect for Rudi Völler. But I went berserk when I saw that red card. I talked to him after the match and I apologized. I'm very happy that he accepted. I have no bad feeling about him now. We even posed for a very funny advert together, years after." (Rijkaard had family problems in this time).

Völler was again selected for the Euro 1992 but was sent home when he suffered an injury in the opening game with CIS.

At the 1994 World Cup, Völler was kept out of the starting line up for all three group games by Jürgen Klinsmann and Karl-Heinz Riedle who scored five between them. He made just one sub appearance in the group stages. He did start the second round tie with Belgium and scored twice in a 3–2 win.

Managerial career

After a disappointing Euro 2000 for Germany under manager Erich Ribbeck, the German Football Association (DFB) appointed Völler as new manager, accepting his lack of coaching qualifications at the time. Initially, he only planned to take interimistic responsibility for one year, following the decision by Bayer 04 Leverkusen and Völler himself (as sporting director of the club) not to make Christoph Daum step down from the national team before 2001. However, Völler extended his contract due to good results, after Daum became involved in a controversial drug scandal. Despite losing to England 5–1 at home and two disappointing draws against Finland during qualification he managed to lead the team to a surprising appearance in the final of the 2002 World Cup against Brazil.

After a first-round exit from Euro 2004, he resigned from his post.

Following his resignation from the German national job, Völler briefly made a comeback at Roma in 2004 as manager. Hired in late August as a last-minute appointment after the shock resignation of Cesare Prandelli, he left the club only one month later after a series of poor results and high-profile disagreements with players, notably Antonio Cassano. He only signed a one-year contract to allow a return of Prandelli the next year, but presided over only one draw and two defeats in the league.

Moving back to the support ranks at Bayer Leverkusen, Völler was named caretaker manager of Leverkusen on 16 September 2005 after the club sacked coach Klaus Augenthaler. Völler served in that role until Michael Skibbe was named as the club's new permanent coach that October. After the arrival of Skibbe, Völler was promoted to become for the second time sports director at Leverkusen.

Völler was (and still is) very popular in Germany. Even when the national squad achieved only modest results, Völler never lost his popularity as the German public knew he was achieving as much as possible with a relatively limited squad. His predecessor Berti Vogts, by contrast, was widely criticised, even during periods of success with a far more talented German squad. The public even forgave Völler when – during a TV interview after a 0–0 draw against Iceland in September 2003 – he lost his temper and yelled at the presenter Waldemar Hartmann in order to defend his team against, what he thought was, unfair press statements.

Personal life
He had two children from a former relationship with a German woman; one of them was Marco, a professional basketball player. Later on in 1995, he married a local woman from Rome during his stay in Italy, adopting her daughter from a previous relationship and having one more son with her.

Career statistics

Club

International

Scores and results list Germany's goal tally first, score column indicates score after each Völler goal.

Managerial statistics

Honours

Player
Roma 
Coppa Italia: 1990–91
UEFA Cup runner-up: 1990–91

Marseille 
UEFA Champions League: 1992–93

Germany 
FIFA World Cup: 1990; runner-up: 1986
UEFA European Championship runner-up: 1992

Individual
UEFA European Under-21 Football Championship Golden Player: 1982
2. Bundesliga Top Goalscorer: 1981–82
Bundesliga Top Goalscorer: 1982–83
kicker Bundesliga Team of the Season: 1982–83, 1983–84, 1984–85, 1994–95
Footballer of the Year (Germany): 1983
UEFA Euro Team of the Tournament: 1984
UEFA Cup Top Goalscorer: 1990–91
A.S. Roma Hall of Fame: 2014

Manager
Germany
FIFA World Cup runner-up: 2002

References

External links

 Rudi Völler at leverkusen.com
 Legends – Rudi Völler German Documentary
 
 

1960 births
Living people
Recipients of the Cross of the Order of Merit of the Federal Republic of Germany
Members of the Order of Merit of North Rhine-Westphalia
Sportspeople from Hanau
Footballers from Hesse
German expatriate footballers
German expatriate sportspeople in France
German expatriate sportspeople in Italy
German footballers
German football managers
Germany national football team managers
Kickers Offenbach players
SV Werder Bremen players
A.S. Roma players
Serie A players
A.S. Roma managers
Serie A managers
Expatriate football managers in Italy
Olympique de Marseille players
Ligue 1 players
Expatriate footballers in France
Bayer 04 Leverkusen players
Germany international footballers
Germany under-21 international footballers
UEFA Euro 1984 players
1986 FIFA World Cup players
UEFA Euro 1988 players
1990 FIFA World Cup players
UEFA Euro 1992 players
1994 FIFA World Cup players
FIFA World Cup-winning players
2002 FIFA World Cup managers
UEFA Euro 2004 managers
Kicker-Torjägerkanone Award winners
Bundesliga players
2. Bundesliga players
Expatriate footballers in Italy
Bayer 04 Leverkusen managers
German expatriate football managers
Association football forwards
UEFA Champions League winning players
West German footballers
West German expatriate sportspeople in Italy
West German expatriate footballers